The VTC Digital Television Network (Vietnamese: Đài Truyền hình Kỹ thuật số VTC), also known as VTC Digital Television or Vietnam Digital Television Network (Đài Truyền hình Kỹ thuật số Việt Nam) is the Vietnamese television network currently owned by Radio the Voice of Vietnam (VOV). Launched on August 19, 2004, it is the second national television network in Vietnam, and the first television provider to broadcast via digital terrestrial network.

VTC Television was operated-and-owned by Vietnam Multimedia Corporation from its founding day until January 1, 2014, when the operations was transferred to the Ministry of Information and Communications. From June 2, 2015, the VTC operational was transferred to VOV, and remained as one of the VOV's multimedia service until now.

The VTC Digital Television currently operating 15 channels, the largest number of all Vietnamese commercial television systems. Most of these channels are currently broadcast under the HDTV 1080p picture format, and one channel is broadcast under the 4K resolution upscale.

The logo of the VTC follows the Reith font and logo that resembles BBC in United Kingdom.

History 
The history of VTC television service and Vietnamese digital television traced back to 2001, when the Vietnam Television Technology Investment and Development Company began the experimental broadcast of eight national and international television programmes on channel 26 UHF. This event has tasked an important implications for the Government to basing, strategic planning and developed the Transmitting digital terrestrial television and Transitioning to digitalised television in Vietnam Strategy until 2020.

On 19 March 2004, to manage and control the content of national and international television programmes, the Editorial Board of Digital Television was founded with the original editorial team only nearly 50 people. This date is reputely considered as the establishment day of the VTC Television Network.

In late 2005, during the 23rd SEA Games in the Philippines, VTC joined in to transmitting every live sporting events and lead-out commentating programmes, marking the first time VTC manufacturing sporting events. After this, VTC gradually become strong point in Vietnamese sporting media as it constantly obtain the rights to broadcast big sporting events of Vietnam and the world, such as SEA Games, Olympics, Premier League, AFC Asian Cup, etc.

On January 4, 2006, the VTC Company was reorganised into corporative and diversive model. The Digital Television Editorial Board and several digital television enterprises of the VTC were merged into a single institution – the VTC Digital Television Network, and remain this name until now.
At the end of 2008, VTC Digital Television launched eight HDTV television channel; three of them were Vietnamese. The numbers of HDTV channels were increase in later years.

From December 12, 2013, to make the VTC Corporation focusing on their main businesses, the operations of VTC Television was transfer to the Ministry of Information and Communications. This issue were made effective on January 1, 2014.   Nearly two years later, the VTC Television were once again transferred to Radio the Voice of Vietnam, and remains as one of the two television enterprise agency of the VOV media group.

Since January 1, 2018, VTC officially adopted its new identity graphics, which shares similarities to the BBC and ITV at some point.

From 2018, VTC Television launch the OTT service called VTC Now, which could make a jostle in the on-demand digital market in Vietnam in the future.

Channels

Currently airing 
 VTC1
One of VTC Television's primary channel, launched on 19 August 2004. First derived as general entertainment, cultural and social-oriented channel, it was later chosen by the Government to be one of twelve (later seven) must-carried informative channels by all TV providers in Vietnam. From that time forward, VTC1 began spending most airtime period to carry news and socio-political programmes. It also broadcast entertainment, documentaries, films and several sport programmes.
 VTC2
Home to scientific, technology and digital media programmes, since 2008. Launched on 19 August 2005, it was first derived to sports and entertainment programmes (and most of all, imports). In a period between 1 November 2019 to 16 August 2020, VTC2 co-operated with Reidius Media to broadcast its own programmes. 
 VTC3
Sports and entertainment-oriented programmes. Launched on 2 November 2006, it is the second sports-oriented channel in Vietnamese subscription television service. From 2017, VTC3 began to broadcast entertainment contents. The channel has been co-operated twice, first from June 17 to October 27, 2019 with AVG Television, then from June 15, 2020 to May 31, 2021 with Vietnam Television's subscription provider VTVCab and NEXT Media JSC. The channel is currently airing repeats from other channels, along with a sport bulletin from VTC Now social platform.
 VTC4
The first and only fashion-oriented channel  in Vietnam, launched on 31 March 2007. From 1 January 2010, VTC4 was relaunched as a family-oriented channel, co-operated with Yeah1 Network, owned by YEG Media Company. The channel was axed on 1 April 2020, and VTC4 is currently airing reruns of its previous contents.
 VTC5
General entertainment channel, first launched on 17 July 2007 as technology and media channel. This content had been switched to VTC2 from 2008, and from this forward VTC5 had been an socialization synthesis channel between 2008 - 2018. From 2018, VTC5 is currently owned by SCTV, one of Vietnam Television's subscription business, and airing rerun programmes from this network.
 VTC6
Home to specialist programming for Northern Region, including news, economy, documentaries, dramas and interest programme. Launched on 3 January 2007, its original content was motion picture orientation.
 VTC7
Home to more entertainment programming, including comedy, documentaries, dramas, children's programming, as well as imported programmes from other countries, particularly Asian countries such as India or the Philippines. Co-operated with IMC Group since 2008.
VTC8
Specialist programming for Southern Region audience; also home to national futsal league and educational programs since mid-2021. Launched on 15 March 2009, it was originally the second feed for VITV, a financial channel operated by VIT Corporation.
 VTC9
First launched on 25 July 2008 as an Olympic Games dedication, it was later relaunched as an infotainment channel on 27 September of the same year with Lasta Multimedia Company as joint venture agency. On 1 January 2018, the channel was return to VTC as a family-oriented channel with legacy contents from previous incarnation.
VTC10
An international channel officially launched in 1 August 2008, offering a best-of package of programming to Vietnamese worldwide with alternative branding NETVIET. In 2012, the channel was one of the must-be-carried informative channels by all TV providers in Vietnam, but dropped soon after.
VTC11  
Children's programming, with archive television repeats in majority.
VTC12
Niche programming from South Korea, with South Korean mainstream entertainment, comedy, drama, documentaries, and more. First launched on 1 January 2010 as a teleshopping channel, it had gone dark from 1 August 2018 to 1 June 2019.
VTC13
On-air experimentally in 28 October 2007, it was officially launched on 1 August 2008 as an interactive music channel. In 2017, the contents of VTC13 became independent with its original owner, Vietnam Multimedia Corporation. Until the end of 2020, as the interactive music content is no longer on air, VTC Television finally dedicated VTC13 as a generalist channel with 4K resolution. As of 2021, VTC13 spends all of its broadcast times to simulcast with VOV1 during early morning, VOV Transportation during daytime and drivetime, along with UHDTV-standard contents, music videos and Covid-19 pandemic information at midnight.
VTC14
One of VTC Television's primary informative channel besides VTC1, VTC10 and VTC16, broadcasting programme about weather and natural disasters. The channel also broadcast people's livelihood related programmes, including news magazines, documentary, science, health, etc. The channel was one of twelve channels to be must-carry on Vietnamese TV provider in 2012, but later dropped.
VTC16
Niche programming for rural audience, including specialist newscasts, magazines, documentaries, foreign language films, etc. Considered as one of VTC Television's primary informative channel, VTC16 was also added by the government into the must-carry TV channel list in 2012, but it was dropped soon after.

Formerly airing 
VTC HD1: Generalist channel, one of the first 3 Vietnamese-language television channels of VTC broadcast in high definition standards. From 2014, the channel was renamed VTC1 HD, which is the HD version of VTC1.
VTC HD2: Movie channel, also one of the first 3 Vietnamese-language television channels of VTC broadcast in high definition standards. The channel was shut down at the beginning of 2016, and became the Vietnamese feed of GEM TV Asia channel until 2018.
VTC HD3: Music and fashion channel, the third in the first 3 Vietnamese-language television channels of VTC broadcast in high definition standards. The channel went off-air at the beginning of 2016.
VTC HD Sports: On air since 2008 under the name VTC HD4, the channel relayed ESPN HD channel, which is Fox Sports 3 Asia at present. From 2011, it was relaunched under the name VTC HD Sports. Since 2012, VTC HD Sports become the HD version of VTC3 channel. There has been a second feed of ESPN HD on VTC HD service, named VTC HD VIP2. 
VTC HD5: relay feed of National Geographic HD channel, broadcast exclusively on VTC HD satellite digital television system in the years 2009–2012.
VTC HD6: relay feed of Fashion One HD channel, broadcast exclusively on the VTC HD digital satellite television system between 2009 and 2012.
VTC HD7: relay feed of CCTV-HD (now CCTV-5+), broadcast exclusively on VTC HD satellite digital television system in the years 2009–2012. Previously, this was the service information channel of the VTC HD service.
VTC HD9: Synthesis channel,  dedicated to live the English Premier League together with VTC3 and VTC HD1. The channel was shut down after VTC HD stopped broadcasting on Asiasat 5 satellite.
VTC HD VIP1: Launched on 2010, its content shares similarities to the VTC HD1 channel. The channel broadcast exclusively on the HD VIP channel package of VTC HD satellite digital television system until 2011.
VTC HD VIP3: Launched on 2010, this channel relay the Asian edition of HBO HD channel and broadcast exclusively on HD VIP channel package of VTC HD satellite digital television system until 2011.
VTC HD VIP4: Broadcast exclusively on HD VIP channel package of VTC HD satellite digital television system from 2010 to 2011, it relayed stream of Star Movies HD (currently the Fox Movies) channel

Other services

VTC News 
Launched on July 7, 2008, it is one of the most-viewed news sites in Vietnam. Since 2015, when its main operator - VTC TV Network - was transferred to the VOV, it became one of two main online news sites of VOV media network.

VTC Now 
Multimedia application, developed by VTC since 2018. It also operate a multi-channel network of its own.

See also 
 Cinema of Vietnam
 Culture of Vietnam
 Digital television in Vietnam
 List of programmes broadcast by VTC
 Media of Vietnam
 Telecommunications in Vietnam
 Television and mass media in Vietnam

References

External links 

 
 Đài truyền hình Kỹ thuật số VTC (OTT service)
 Báo điện tử VTC News - Đọc báo tin tức trong ngày hôm nay (online news site)

Communications in Vietnam
Mass media companies of Vietnam
Government-owned companies of Vietnam